Salihat is an Islamic term for just deeds, one of the overarching themes in the early Meccan Suras of the Qur'an.

References
Wael B Hallaq. The Impossible State: Islam, Politics and Modernity's Moral Predicament. Columbia University Press. New York. 2013. . Pages 87, 88 and 218.
Thomas Patrick Hughes. "Good Works" in A Dictionary of Islam. W H Allen & Co. London. 1885. Second Reprint by Asian Education Services, New Delhi, 2001. Page 149.

Islamic terminology